The 15 cm sIG 33 (Sf) auf Panzerkampfwagen I Ausf B, sometimes referred to (unofficially) as the Sturmpanzer I Bison, was a German self-propelled gun used during World War II.

Development and history
The Invasion of Poland had shown that the towed sIG 33 guns assigned to the infantry gun companies of the motorized infantry regiments had difficulties keeping up with the tanks during combat. The easiest solution was to modify a spare tank chassis to carry it into battle. A sIG 33 was mounted on the chassis of the Panzer I Ausf. B, complete with carriage and wheels, in place of the turret and superstructure. This protected little more than the gun and the gunner himself from small arms fire and shell fragments, the loaders being completely exposed. The rearmost section of armor was hinged to ease reloading.

There was no room to stow any ammunition, so it had to be carried by a separate vehicle. When mounted, the sIG 33 had a total traverse of 25° and could elevate from -4° to +75°. The gun used an Rblf36 sight. The chassis was overloaded and breakdowns were frequent. The vehicle's extreme height and lack of on-board ammunition were severe tactical drawbacks.

Thirty-eight were converted in February 1940 by Alkett.

Combat use 

Thirty-six vehicles were organized into independent schwere Infanteriegeschütz-Kompanie (mot.S.) ("self-propelled heavy infantry gun companies") numbers 701–706, assigned to Panzer divisions in the Battle of France as follows:
 Company 701, to the 9th Panzer Division
 Company 702, to the 1st Panzer Division
 Company 703, to the 2nd Panzer Division
 Company 704, to the 5th Panzer Division
 Company 705, to the 7th Panzer Division
 Company 706, to the 10th Panzer Division

As part of the 5th Panzer Division, assigned to the German XIVth Motorized Army Corps, the 704th company participated in Operation Marita, the invasion of the Balkans.

Later in 1941, the same assignment was maintained for Operation Barbarossa, the invasion of the Soviet Union. The 705th and 706th belonging to the 7th and 10th Panzer Divisions respectively, were destroyed at this time. Of the remaining companies, only the 701st participated in the opening stages of the subsequent Case Blue in 1942, although it, and its parent 9th Panzer Division, were transferred to Army Group Center by the end of the summer of 1942.

The last reference to these vehicles is with the 704th Company of the 5th Panzer Division during the middle of 1943.

Notes

References
 Chamberlain, Peter, and Hilary L. Doyle. Thomas L. Jentz (Technical Editor). Encyclopedia of German Tanks of World War Two: A Complete Illustrated Directory of German Battle Tanks, Armoured Cars, Self-propelled Guns, and Semi-tracked Vehicles, 1933–1945. London: Arms and Armour Press, 1978 (revised edition 1993) .
 Niehorster, Leo. German World War II Organizational Series; Volume 3/I: Mechanized Army Divisions (22 June 1941) Hannover, Germany: Niehorster, 1990
 Niehorster, Leo. German World War II Organizational Series; Volume 4/I: Mechanized Army Divisions (28 June 1942) Hannover, Germany: Niehorster, 1994
 Trojca, Waldemar and Jaugitz, Markus. Sturmtiger and Sturmpanzer in Combat. Katowice, Poland: Model Hobby, 2008

External links 
 wwiivehicles.com
  "Lexicon der Wehrmacht" site, "Panzerkampfwagen I" page (accessed 2041-03-10)

World War II self-propelled artillery of Germany
150 mm artillery
Military vehicles introduced from 1940 to 1944